Martinus "Tinus" Lambillion (August 17, 1912 – January 18, 1994) was a Dutch boxer who competed in the 1936 Summer Olympics.

He was born and died in Rotterdam.

In 1936 he was eliminated in the first round of the flyweight class after losing his fight to the upcoming silver medalist Gavino Matta.

External links
profile

1912 births
1994 deaths
Flyweight boxers
Olympic boxers of the Netherlands
Boxers at the 1936 Summer Olympics
Boxers from Rotterdam
Dutch male boxers